Pullattukunnel Temple is a temple located at Elamgulam, Kerala, India.

Hindu temples in Kottayam district